The Singapore Ambassador to China is the official representative of the Republic of Singapore to the People's Republic of China.

List of representatives

See also
 China–Singapore relations
 Chinese Ambassador to Singapore
 Singapore Ambassador to Russia
 Singapore Ambassador to the United States
 List of High Commissioners and Ambassadors of Singapore

References 

Ambassadors of Singapore to China
China
Singapore